Hohenberg an der Eger is a town in the district of Wunsiedel, in Upper Franconia, Bavaria, Germany. It is situated on the river Eger, on the border with the Czech Republic, 11 km west of Cheb, and 14 km northeast of Marktredwitz. It was home to Hutschenreuther ceramic.  Though best known for its ceramic production, Hohenberg has also produced some of Bavaria's elite soccer talent.  Mauricio Göhlert played for the youth teams of SpVgg SV Weiden and Borussia Mönchengladbach before signing with SV Mitterteich in 2013.

References

 
Wunsiedel (district)